Santa Rita do Pardo is a municipality located in the Brazilian state of Mato Grosso do Sul. Its population is 7,900 (2020) and its area is 6,142 km².

References

Municipalities in Mato Grosso do Sul